James Harold "Lefty" Wallace (August 12, 1921 – July 28, 1982), was a Major League Baseball pitcher who played in 1942, 1945, and 1946 with the Boston Braves. He batted and threw left-handed.

From 1943 to 1944 Wallace served in the military during World War II.

Wallace was born in and died in Evansville, Indiana.

References

External links

1921 births
1982 deaths
Boston Braves players
Major League Baseball pitchers
Baseball players from Indiana
Bridgeport Bees players
Evansville Bees players
Indianapolis Indians players
Milwaukee Brewers (minor league) players
Syracuse Chiefs players
Oakland Oaks (baseball) players
Birmingham Barons players
Wichita Indians players
United States Army personnel of World War II